Nhuận Phú Tân is a rural commune of Mỏ Cày Bắc District, Bến Tre Province, Vietnam. The commune covers 18.47 km2, with a population of 13,136 in 1999, and a population density of 711 inhabitants/km2.

References

 

Communes of Bến Tre province
Populated places in Bến Tre province